Oluremi Tinubu  (born 21 September 1960) is a Nigerian politician who served as the first lady of Lagos State as wife of former  Lagos governor, Bola Tinubu, from 1999 to 2007. She is currently a senator representing Lagos Central Senatorial District at the Nigerian National Assembly. She is a member of the All Progressives Congress (APC) political party.

Early life
Oluremi Tinubu was born on 21 September 1960. She is the youngest of 12 children in her family, she hails from Ogun State.

Education
Tinubu started her educational career at Our Lady of Apostles Secondary School Ijebu-Ode where she obtained her West African Senior Secondary School Certificate Exam (WASSCE) in 1979, and PGD from The Redeemed Christian bible college in 2010

Tinubu received a B.S. in Education from the University of Ife, and a National Certificate of Education in Botany and Zoology from the Adeyemi College of Education.

Political career
She became the first lady of Lagos State when her husband, Bola Tinubu, was elected as governor.  As first lady, she established the New Era Foundation, dedicated to establishing centers for "all round development of young ones and promote public awareness on environmental health and community service."

When Tinubu was elected, it was challenged at the Legislative House Election Petition Tribunal - which later convened and upheld the election in 2012.

Tinubu was one of over 100 senators elected in the 8th assembly in 2015.  Six of these were women.  The others were Stella Oduah and Uche Ekwunife, who both represent Anambra, Fatimat Raji Rasaki, Rose Okoji Oko and Binta Garba.  At the 2019 general elections, she retained her senatorial seat representing Lagos Central, making it her third tenure in office

Senator Tinubu in 2016 requested adequate security from the Inspector General of Police as a result of an alleged threat of assault by colleague and fellow party member Dino Melaye during a senate closed-door session.

She was listed alongside Babajide Sanwo-Olu, Tony Elumelu and other prominent people for the  Eko Excellence Awards in 2019. 

In 2020, she called for the creation of state police as a way of tackling the rising spate of insecurity in the country.

She is a firm believer in investing in Society Human Capital and Her Youth Empowerment and Skill Acquisation  Scheme in collaboration with Good Boys and Girls Empowerment Scheme (GBGES) has produced 1`172 beneficiaries. About 164 youths were tranined on various skills and received start up kits and capital of about N40,000 each.

In March 2021, Senator Tinubu proposed a bill to reform the Nigerian Postal Service (NIPOST) to make it a more viable entity. She also received the award for the most impactful female senator at The Guardian organized Inter national Women's Day Summit 2021.

Awards and honors
She has won several awards and received several honors, the awards and honors she received are: National award of the Officer of the Order of the Niger [OON], Member, Board of Trustees of Kings’ University, Ode-Omu; Ghana Noble International Award for Leadership (2004), Gambian Diamond Award for Immense Contribution to the Emancipation of People from Poverty (2005)

Personal life
She is married to former Governor and Senator of Lagos State Bola Tinubu, they have 3 children, Zainab Abisola Tinubu, Habibat Tinubu and Olayinka Tinubu. She is a stepmother to his 3 children from previous relationships, Olajide Tinubu (deceased), Folashade Tinubu, and Oluwaseyi Tinubu. She is a Christian, and is an ordained pastor of the Redeemed Christian Church of God. Her ordination took place in 2018 at the Old Arena of RCCG, Lagos/Ibadan Expressway where the church held its 66th annual convention themed “Dominion”. She is also Grand Matron of the Committee of Wives of Lagos State Officials (COWLSO).

References

External links
 Facebook page

Living people
1960 births
Obafemi Awolowo University alumni
Action Congress of Nigeria politicians
Members of the Senate (Nigeria)
Members of the Lagos State House of Assembly
Yoruba women in politics
First Ladies of Lagos State
Adeyemi College of Education alumni
Oluremi
People from Ogun State
Nigerian Christians
Women members of the Senate (Nigeria)
21st-century Nigerian politicians
21st-century Nigerian women politicians
All Progressives Congress politicians